Federico Emanuel Milo (born 10 January 1992) is an Argentine professional footballer who plays as a left-back.

Career
Milo began with Argentine Primera División club Arsenal de Sarandí. He made his debut for the club on 22 September 2013 in a league draw with Rosario Central. Two more Primera División appearances followed during 2013–14 before he made his continental debut as he featured in Arsenal's 3–0 victory against Santos Laguna in the 2014 Copa Libertadores. He went onto make 26 appearances in all competitions for Arsenal between the 2013–14 season and the 2016 season. Milo was loaned to fellow Primera División team San Martín in July 2018.

Career statistics
.

Honours
Arsenal de Sarandí
Copa Argentina: 2012–13

References

External links

1992 births
Living people
People from Quilmes
Argentine people of Italian descent
Argentine footballers
Argentine expatriate footballers
Argentine expatriate sportspeople in Greece
Expatriate footballers in Greece
Association football fullbacks
Argentine Primera División players
Super League Greece players
Arsenal de Sarandí footballers
San Martín de San Juan footballers
Unión de Santa Fe footballers
Aldosivi footballers
Ionikos F.C. players
Sportspeople from Buenos Aires Province